Oiasso, Oiasona or Oiarso was a Basque Roman town located on the left bank of the Bidasoa estuary in the Bay of Biscay (current Basque Country, in Spanish territory). Archaeological evidence unearthed recently pinpoints the core area of Oiasso in the old quarter of Irun (Gipuzkoa) by the Spanish-French border, where harbour and bath remains have been discovered. However, two other focuses in Cape Higuer and hermitage Ama Xantalen (necropolis and mausoleum) point to a wider complex outside the main nucleus.

Actually, some authors note that the name Oiasso may have applied to the whole valley, arguing that the very name of the Bidasoa River may stem from Latin "via ad Oiasso", eventually rendering Bidasoa in Basque. Furthermore, it is widely assumed that the name for the town Oiartzun some 10 km away may have developed from Oiasso. A Roman road linked this spot to ancient Pompaelo all the way through the Saltus Vasconum (the Vasconian wilderness), with the road being built to connect the Vasconian main town to the mines of Arditurri set in the massif of Aiako Harria. Romans showed an early interest on them on account of the ore (largely silver and copper) they could extract from them, using the port and factories of Oiasso to process and dispatch the freight away.

A museum was founded recently in Irun to cater for the interest the vestiges unveiled have aroused and for tourism. 

Earlier it was misidentified with current San Sebastián, that is still nicknamed la bella Easo ("The beautiful Easo", a Hispanization of Oiasso).

See also
Iruña-Veleia

References

External links
 Oiasso Roman Museum
 
 
 
 

Basque history
Roman towns and cities in Spain
Former populated places in Spain
Vascones